Föhr-Amrum is an Amt ("collective municipality") in the district of Nordfriesland, in Schleswig-Holstein, Germany. The Amt covers the islands Föhr and Amrum. Its seat is in Wyk auf Föhr. Föhr-Amrum was created on 1 January 2007 as a merger of the two Ämter Föhr-Land and Amrum and the formerly independent town of Wyk.

Subdivision
The Amt Föhr-Amrum consists of the following municipalities:

Alkersum
Borgsum 
Dunsum
Midlum
Nebel 
Nieblum 
Norddorf 
Oevenum 
 Oldsum 
 Süderende 
 Utersum 
 Witsum 
 Wittdün 
 Wrixum 
 Wyk auf Föhr

References

External links
 Amt Föhr-Amrum

Ämter in Schleswig-Holstein